Daniel Nielson (born 9 May 1996) is a former professional Australian rules footballer who played for the North Melbourne Football Club in the Australian Football League (AFL). He was drafted by North Melbourne with their second selection and twenty-fifth overall in the 2014 national draft. Nielson is of German ancestry. He was delisted at the end of the 2018 season.
Neilson played for VFL team Werribee in 2019.

References

External links

1996 births
Living people
North Melbourne Football Club players
Eastern Ranges players
Australian rules footballers from Victoria (Australia)
Australian people of German descent